There are over 20,000 Grade II* listed buildings in England. This page is a list of these buildings in the district of Epping Forest in Essex.

Epping Forest

|}

Notes

External links

Epping Forest District
Lists of Grade II* listed buildings in Essex